Abendrot is the third and final studio album by American emo band, You Blew It! The album was released through Triple Crown Records on November 11, 2016. It was announced on September 21, 2016. The first single, "Autotheology" was released the same day. In November 16 of the same year the band announced a 2017 US tour in support of the album with All Get Out and Free Throw as their opening acts. The music video for the song "Arrowhead" was released on February 16, 2017 and was directed by Foxing's Josh Coll.

Track listing

Personnel 
Adapted from the Bandcamp page.

 Tanner Jones – vocals, guitar 
 Trevor O’Hare – guitar, vocals 
 Andrew Anaya – guitar 
 Andrew Vila – bass
 Matthew Nissley – drums 
 Evan Weiss – synths, piano, organ, vibraphone, other auxiliary instrumentation, select vocal harmonies on "Basin & Range" 
 Matt Jordan – auxiliary percussion, engineering wonders 
 Adam Beck – auxiliary percussion, assistant engineering wonders

Charts

References 

2016 albums
You Blew It! albums
Triple Crown Records albums